"Love So Right" is an R&B ballad recorded by the Bee Gees. It was the second single released on the album Children of the World.

Background
It was written by Barry, Robin and Maurice Gibb early in 1976. Recording started on 18 January, then 8 February and finished on 8 May in Quebec, Canada with the other songs "Can't Keep a Good Man Down", "Boogie Child", "Subway", "The Way It Was" and "You Should Be Dancing". It was the second consecutive Bee Gees single (following "You Should Be Dancing") to feature Barry Gibb's falsetto exclusively for lead vocals. Barry later stated that the song's R&B influence was inspired by the group "trying to be The Delfonics."

Release
"Love So Right" hit number three on the Billboard Hot 100 as well as charting on the Billboard Adult Contemporary chart. In addition, it was a minor hit on the Billboard Black Singles chart, peaking at number 37. Its B-side was "You Stepped into My Life". In Canada, "You Stepped into My Life" was chosen as the A-side and this song was the B-side.

Reception
Cash Box said that "the R&B flavor is still there, so the appeal is across the board" and "those famous harmonies are in full force." Record World said that while it is "slower and not as overtly disco" as the Bee Gees' previous single "You Should Be Dancing", "there appears to be no way they could miss with material like this."

Track listing

Chart performance

Weekly charts

Year-end charts

References

1976 songs
1976 singles
Bee Gees songs
Songs written by Barry Gibb
Songs written by Robin Gibb
Songs written by Maurice Gibb
Song recordings produced by Barry Gibb
Song recordings produced by Robin Gibb
Song recordings produced by Maurice Gibb
RSO Records singles
Rhythm and blues ballads
Pop ballads
1970s ballads